Zakaria Silini (born 5 July 2003) is an Algerian professional footballer who plays as a forward for Belgian First Division A club Seraing.

International career 
In October 2021, Silini was called up to the Algeria national under-20 football team by head coach Mohamed Lacete for a one week training camp in Rouiba.

References 

2003 births
Living people
Belgian footballers
Algerian footballers
Belgian people of Algerian descent
Association football forwards
Sint-Truidense V.V. players
R.F.C. Seraing (1922) players
Belgian Pro League players
Algeria youth international footballers